The 2012 Women's Hockey Champions Trophy was the 20th edition of the Hockey Champions Trophy for women. It was held from 28 January to 5 February 2012 in Rosario, Argentina. This was the last annual edition of the tournament until 2014 when it returned to its original biennial format due to the introduction of the World League.

Argentina won the tournament for the fifth time after defeating Great Britain 1–0 in the final. The Netherlands won the third place match by defeating Germany 5–4.

Format
Another format change was announced. The eight participating teams were split into two groups. After they played a round-robin every team advanced to the knockout stage. From there on, a knockout system was used to determine the winner.

Qualification
A change in the qualification process was decided. Along with the host nation, the top five finishers from the tournament's previous edition and the winner of the 2011 Champions Challenge I qualify automatically. In addition to the two teams nominated by the FIH Executive Board, the following eight teams, competed in this tournament.

 (Host nation)
 (Defending champions)
 (Third in 2011 Champions Trophy)
 (Fourth in 2011 Champions Trophy)
 (Fifth in 2011 Champions Trophy as England)
 (Winner of 2011 Champions Challenge I)
 (Nominated by FIH Executive Board)
 (Nominated by FIH Executive Board)

Umpires
Below are the 10 umpires appointed by the International Hockey Federation:

Julie Ashton-Lucy (AUS)
Frances Block (GBR)
Carolina de la Fuente (ARG)
Elena Eskina (RUS)
Kang Hyun-young (KOR)
Michelle Meister (GER)
Carol Metchette (IRL)
Miao Lin (CHN)
Lesley Pieterse (RSA)
Wendy Stewart (CAN)

Results
All times are Argentina Time (UTC−03:00)

First round

Pool A

Pool B

Second round

Quarter-finals

Fifth to eighth place classification

Crossover

Seventh and eighth place

Fifth and sixth place

First to fourth place classification

Semi-finals

Third and fourth place

Final

Awards

Statistics

Final standings

Goalscorers

5 goals
 Crista Cullen
 Rika Komazawa
 Lee Seon-ok

4 goals
 Noel Barrionuevo
 Ma Yibo
 Kim Lammers
 Maartje Paumen
 Lidewij Welten

3 goals
 Nina Hasselmann
 Celine Wilde
 Lisa Hahn
 Alex Danson
 Akane Shibata
 Cathryn Finlayson
 Katie Glynn
 Stacey Michelsen

2 goals
 Delfina Merino
 Josefina Sruoga
 Zhao Yudiao
 Natascha Keller
 Ashleigh Ball
 Helen Richardson
 Kaori Fujio
 Kim Jong-eun
 Kim Jong-hee
 Marilyn Agliotti
 Carlien Dirkse van den Heuvel

1 goal
 Luciana Aymar
 Martina Cavallero
 Silvina D'Elía
 Rosario Luchetti
 Sofía Maccari
 Carla Rebecchi
 De Jiaojiao
 Fu Baorong
 Gao Lihua
 Song Qingling
 Tang Chunling
 Anke Brockmann
 Hannah Krüger
 Marie Mävers
 Christina Schütze
 Maike Stöckel
 Sarah Thomas
 Georgie Twigg
 Ai Murakami
 Izuki Tanaka
 Cheon Eun-bi
 Han Hye-lyoung
 Hong Yoo-jin
 Kim Ok-ju
 Maartje Goderie
 Naomi van As
 Kitty van Male
 Samantha Harrison
 Anita Punt

References

External links
Official website
Results book

2012
2012 in women's field hockey
hockey
International women's field hockey competitions hosted by Argentina
Sport in Rosario, Santa Fe
January 2012 sports events in South America
February 2012 sports events in South America